Reclining Figure 1938 (LH 192)  is a small sculpture by Henry Moore of an sinuous abstracted human figure. An enlarged version was made in 1984 for the Oversea-Chinese Banking Corporation, Singapore.

Description
The sculpture is recognisable as a human form.  The head has a notch, like a claw; the narrow torso has two dangling breasts; the left arm rests on the ground, while the right arm and ribbon-like backbone are linked to a pelvis resting on the ground, from which to one long bone-like limb extends to one side.

Casts
A  lead maquette was made by Moore in 1938, and sold by him to the Museum of Modern Art in New York in 1939. 
An edition of nine bronzes was cast in 1946; one example is held by the Peggy Guggenheim Collection in Venice, and another in the Leeds Art Gallery since 1991.

The original Large Reclining Figure (LH 192b) is outside the OCBC Centre in Singapore, with an artist's copy in bronze at the Henry Moore Foundation in Perry Green, Hertfordshire.

See also
List of sculptures by Henry Moore

Notes

References
 Reclining Figure 1938 (bronze), Henry Moore Foundation
 Henry Moore, Reclining Figure, 1938 (lead), Museum of Modern Art
 Reclining Figure, 1938 (cast 1946) (bronze), Peggy Guggenheim Collectrion
 Large Reclining Figure 1984 (fibreglass), Henry Moore Foundation
 Large Reclining Figure 1984 (bronze), Henry Moore Foundation

1938 sculptures
1984 sculptures
Bronze sculptures in Singapore
Outdoor sculptures in Singapore
Public art in Singapore
Sculptures by Henry Moore